This is a list of diplomatic missions in Sudan. There are currently 61 embassies in Khartoum. Some countries maintain consulates in other Sudanese cities (not including honorary consulates).

Diplomatic missions in Khartoum

Embassies

Other delegations or missions 
 (Delegation)
 (Embassy office)

Consular missions

Khartoum 
 (Consulate-General)
 (Consulate-General)

Al-Gadarif 
 (Consulate-General)

Geneina 
  (Consulate-General)

Port Sudan 
 (Consulate-General)

Non-resident embassies 
In Cairo except as noted

 

 (Rome) 

 (Abu Dhabi)

 

 (London) 

  

  
   
 (Algiers)
 (Rome)
 (Rome) 
 (Reykjavik)   
  

 (Rome)
 (Riyadh)
 (Kuwait City)  
 (Riyadh) 
 

 
  
  
  
 (Suva)
 
 

 (New Delhi)
 (Riyadh)

 (Riyadh)
 (Addis Ababa)
 (Riyadh)
 (Geneva)
 (Abu Dhabi)

 (Riyadh) 
 

 (Addis Ababa)
 (Addis Ababa)

Closed missions

See also 
 Foreign relations of Sudan
 List of diplomatic missions of Sudan

References

External links 
 Ministry of Foreign Affairs of Sudan

List
Sudan
Diplomatic missions